Below is the list of populated places in Aksaray Province, Turkey by the districts. In the following lists first place in each list is the administrative center of the district.

Aksaray 
               
Aksaray
Acıpınar, Aksaray
Ağzıkarahan, Aksaray
Akçakent, Aksaray
Akhisar, Aksaray
Akin, Aksaray
Alayhanı, Aksaray
Altınkaya, Aksaray
Armutlu, Aksaray
Ataköy, Aksaray
Babakonağı, Aksaray
Bağlı, Aksaray
Bağlıkaya, Aksaray
Bayındır, Aksaray
Baymış, Aksaray
Bebek, Aksaray
Borucu, Aksaray
Bostanlık, Aksaray
Boyalı, Aksaray
Bozcatepe, Aksaray
Büyükgüve, Aksaray
Büyükpörnekler, Aksaray
Cankıllı, Aksaray
Çağlayan, Aksaray
Çavdarlılar, Aksaray
Çekiçler, Aksaray
Çeltek, Aksaray
Çimeliyeni, Aksaray
Çolaknebi, Aksaray
Darıhüyük, Aksaray
Dikmen, Aksaray
Doğantarla, Aksaray
Ekecikgödeler, Aksaray
Ekeciktolu, Aksaray
Ekecikyeni, Aksaray
Elmacık, Aksaray
Fatmauşağı, Aksaray
Gençosman, Aksaray
Gökçe, Aksaray
Göksügüzel, Aksaray
Gözlükuyu, Aksaray
Gücünkaya, Aksaray
Gültepe, Aksaray
Hatipoğlutolu, Aksaray
Helvadere, Aksaray
Hırkato, Aksaray
İncesu, Aksaray
İsmailağatolu, Aksaray
Kalebalta, Aksaray
Karacaören, Aksaray
Karaçayır, Aksaray
Karakova, Aksaray
Karakuyu, Aksaray
Karaören, Aksaray
Macarlı, Aksaray
Nurgöz, Aksaray
Sağırkaraca
Sağlık, Aksaray
Salmanlı, Aksaray
Sapmaz, Aksaray
Sarayhan, Aksaray
Sarıağı, Aksarayl
Seleciköse, Aksaray
Sevinçli, Aksaray
Sultanhanı, Aksaray
Susadı, Aksaray
Şeyhler, Aksaray
Taptukemre, Aksaray
Taşpınar, Aksaray
Tatlıca, Aksaray
Topakkaya, Aksaray
Ulukışla, Aksaray
Ulukışlatolu, Aksaray
Yağan, Aksaray
Yalman, Aksaray
Yalnızceviz, Aksaray
Yanyurt, Aksaray
Yapılcan, Aksaray
Yenikent, Aksaray
Yenipınar, Aksaray
Yeşilova, Aksaray
Yeşiltepe, Aksaray
Yeşiltömek, Aksaray
Yuva, Aksaray

Ağaçören 

Ağaçören
Abalı, Ağaçören
Abdiuşağı, Ağaçören
Ahırlı, Ağaçören
Avşar, Ağaçören
Camili, Ağaçören
Çatalçeşme, Ağaçören
Dadılar, Ağaçören
Demircili, Ağaçören
Göllü, Ağaçören
Göynük, Ağaçören
Güzelöz, Ağaçören
Hacıahmetlidavutlu, Ağaçören
Hacıahmetlitepeköy, Ağaçören
Hacıismailli, Ağaçören
Hüsrevköy, Ağaçören
Kaşıçalık, Ağaçören
Kederli, Ağaçören
Kılıçlı, Ağaçören
Kırımini, Ağaçören
Kurtini, Ağaçören
Kütüklü, Ağaçören
Oymaağaç, Ağaçören
Sarıağıl, Ağaçören
Sarıhasanlı
Sofular, Ağaçören
Yağmurhüyüğü, Ağaçören
Yenice, Ağaçören
Yenişabanlı, Ağaçören

Eskil 

Eskil
Başaran, Eskil
Bayramdüğün, Eskil
Büğet, Eskil
Celil, Eskil
Çukuryurt, Eskil
Eşmekaya, Eskil
Gümüşdüğün, Eskil
Güneşli, Eskil
Katrancı, Eskil
Kökez, Eskil
Sağsak, Eskil

Gülağaç

Gülağaç
Akmezar, Gülağaç
Bekarlar, Gülağaç
Camiliören, Gülağaç
Çatalsu, Gülağaç
Cumhuriyet, Gülağaç
Demirci, Gülağaç*Düğüz
Gülpınar, Gülağaç
Kızılkaya, Gülağaç
Pınarbaşı, Gülağaç
Saratlı, Gülağaç
Sofular, Gülağaç
Süleymanhüyüğü, Gülağaç

Güzelyurt 

Güzelyurt
Alanyurt, Güzelyurt
Belisırma, Güzelyurt
Bozcayurt, Güzelyurt
Gaziemir, Güzelyurt
Ihlara, Güzelyurt
Ilısu, Güzelyurt
Selime, Güzelyurt
Sivrihisar, Güzelyurt
Uzunkaya, Güzelyurt
Yaprakhisar, Güzelyurt

Ortaköy 

Ortaköy, Aksaray
Akpınar, Ortaköy
Balcı, Ortaköy
Bozkır, Ortaköy
Camuzluk, Ortaköy
Ceceli, Ortaköy
Cumali, Ortaköy
Çatin, Ortaköy
Devedamı, Ortaköy
Durhasanlı, Ortaköy
Gökkaya, Ortaköy
Gökler, Ortaköy
Hacıibrahimuşağı
Hacımahmutuşağı
Harmandalı, Ortaköy
Hıdırlı, Ortaköy
Hocabeyli, Ortaköy
Karapınar, Ortaköy
Kümbet, Ortaköy
Namlıkışla, Ortaköy
Oğuzlar, Ortaköy
Ozancık, Ortaköy
Pınarbaşı, Ortaköy
Pirli, Ortaköy
Reşadiye, Ortaköy
Salarıalaca, Ortaköy
Salarıgödeler, Ortaköy
Sarıkaraman, Ortaköy
Satansarı, Ortaköy
Seksenuşağı, Ortaköy
Yıldırımlar, Ortaköy

Sarıyahşi 

Sarıyahşi
Bekdik, Sarıyahşi
Boğazköy, Sarıyahşi
Demirciobası, Sarıyahşi
Sipahiler, Sarıyahşi
Yaylak, Sarıyahşi
Yenitorunobası, Sarıyahşi

References 

Geography of Aksaray Province
Aksaray
List